
Year 361 BC was a year of the pre-Julian Roman calendar. At the time, it was known as the Year of the Consulship of Stolo and Peticus (or, less frequently, year 393 Ab urbe condita). The denomination 361 BC for this year has been used since the early medieval period, when the Anno Domini calendar era became the prevalent method in Europe for naming years.

Events 
 By place 
 Persian Empire 
 With the Persian empire weakening, revolts occur in many parts of the empire, including Sidon, a prosperous and rich Phoenician city.

 Egypt 
 The Egyptians under their King Teos and the Spartans under King Agesilaus II, with some Athenian mercenaries under their general Chabrias, set out to attack the Persian King's Phoenician cities. However, they have to return almost at once due to revolts back in Egypt. Subsequently, Agesilaus II quarrels with the Egyptian king and joins a revolt against him.

 Greece 
 Callistratus of Aphidnae, an Athenian orator and general, and the Athenian general, Chabrias, are brought to trial in Athens on account of the refusal of the Thebans to surrender the city of Oropus, which on Callistratus' advice the Thebans have been allowed to occupy temporarily. Despite his magnificent oration in his defence (which so impresses Demosthenes that he resolves to study oratory), Callistratus is condemned to death. He flees to Methone in Macedonia, where he is accommodated by King Perdiccas III who draws on his financial expertise. Chabrias is acquitted and then accepts a command under the King of Egypt, Teos, who is defending his country against Persian attempts at reconquest.

 Sicily 
 Plato returns once more to Syracuse to teach the young Syracusan tyrant Dionysius II. He fails to reconcile the tyrant to Dion, who Dionysius II banished in 366 BC. Because of this, Plato is forced to flee Syracuse to save his life.

Births 
 Agathocles, tyrant of Syracuse (d. 289 BC)

Deaths 
Leosthenes, Athenian admiral

References